Dinello or DiNello is a surname. Notable people with the surname include:

Gilbert DiNello (1935—1996), American politician
Paul Dinello (born 1962), American comedian, actor, writer, director, and producer

See also
Dinelli